In mathematics, the maximum modulus principle in complex analysis states that if f is a holomorphic function, then the modulus |f | cannot exhibit a strict local maximum that is properly within the domain of f. 

In other words, either f is locally a constant function, or, for any point z0 inside the domain of f there exist other points arbitrarily close to z0 at which |f | takes larger values.

Formal statement
Let f be a holomorphic function on some connected open subset D of the complex plane ℂ and taking complex values. If z0 is a point in D such that 
 
for all z in some neighborhood of z0, then f is constant on D.

This statement can be viewed as a special case of the open mapping theorem, which states that a nonconstant holomorphic function maps open sets to open sets: If |f| attains a local maximum at z, then the image of a sufficiently small open neighborhood of z cannot be open, so f is constant.

Related statement

This follows from the first version as follows. If  is not on the boundary, then the maximum modulus principle implies that  is constant, so  also attains the same maximum at any point of the boundary.

Minimum modulus principle

for all z in some neighborhood of z0, then f is constant on D.

Sketches of proofs

Using the maximum principle for harmonic functions
One can use the equality

for complex natural logarithms to deduce that  is a harmonic function. Since z0 is a local maximum for this function also, it follows from the maximum principle that    is constant. Then, using the Cauchy–Riemann equations we show that  = 0, and thus that  is constant as well.

Using Gauss's mean value theorem
Another proof works by using Gauss's mean value theorem to "force" all points within overlapping open disks to assume the same value as the maximum. The disks are laid such that their centers form a polygonal path from the value where  is maximized to any other point in the domain, while being totally contained within the domain. Thus the existence of a maximum value implies that all the values in the domain are the same, thus  is constant.

Physical interpretation

A physical interpretation of this principle comes from the heat equation. That is, since  is harmonic, it is thus the steady state of a heat flow on the region D. Suppose a strict maximum was attained on the interior of D, the heat at this maximum would be dispersing to the points around it, which would contradict the assumption that this represents the steady state of a system.

Applications 
The maximum modulus principle has many uses in complex analysis, and may be used to prove the following:
 The fundamental theorem of algebra.
 Schwarz's lemma, a result which in turn has many generalisations and applications in complex analysis.
 The Phragmén–Lindelöf principle, an extension to unbounded domains.
 The Borel–Carathéodory theorem, which bounds an analytic function in terms of its real part.
 The Hadamard three-lines theorem, a result about the behaviour of bounded holomorphic functions on a line between two other parallel lines in the complex plane.

References
  (See chapter 5.)

External links 
 

Mathematical principles
Theorems in complex analysis